Shane Paul McGhie (born November 26, 1993) is an American film and television actor. He is known for his role as Deputy Joseph Harris in Entertainment One's crime drama television series Deputy.

Life and career 
McGhie was born in Los Angeles, California, to Jamaican parents. Shane attended Beverly Hills High School where he studied in the Theatre Arts department of the school. While in school, Shane was also said to have received classical vocal training in Madrigals. In June 2011, after his graduation from high school Shane attended California State University, Northridge for one year while pursuing his acting career. After a year in the institution he transferred to University of Southern California where he eventually graduated with a BFA in Acting in 2016.

In 2017, Shane McGhie landed a role in CBS's crime drama series Criminal Minds where he played a minor role in (season 13) as Hunter. After his role as hunter in Criminal Minds, he was given yet another minor role in Shameless (American TV series). In 2018, he played a recurring role in Sacred Lies as Jude Leland. In 2019, he played a role as Jamal Barry in BET Films comedy drama What Men Want alongside Taraji P. Henson, Aldis Hodge, Erykah Badu and Tracy Morgan. In 2019, he was featured in the film After as Landon, reprising the role in the 2020 sequel After We Collided. In 2023 he guest starred in the third episode of Rian Johnson’s TV series, Poker Face starring Natasha Lyonne.

Filmography

Film

Television

References

External links

Living people
1993 births
People from Los Angeles
20th-century American male actors
21st-century American male actors
American male film actors
American male television actors
American actors of Jamaican descent
Male actors from Los Angeles